Cowcow is a Japanese comedy duo managed by the entertainment conglomerate Yoshimoto Kogyo who perform manzai comedy. They have been guests on quite a few TV variety shows, such as Mecha-Mecha Iketeru!.

Awards
Cowcow won the best newcomer award at the 36th Kamigata Manzai Awards in 2001.

References

Japanese comedy duos